BLO or Blo may refer to:

Barbie Liberation Organization, doll jammers
Beltran-Leyva Organization or Beltrán-Leyva Cartel, Mexican criminal organization
Boston Lyric Opera, United States, an opera company
 Blaydon railway station, Blaydon-on-Tyne, England, National Rail station code
 Blo (band), a Nigerian psychedelic funk ensemble
 Vincenzo Blo, Italian gymnast 
 British Liaison Officers, liaison officers sent by the British Special Operations Executive into Nazi-occupied Europe to contact resistance groups